Michael D. Polensek (born November 16, 1949) is a City Council member in Cleveland, Ohio, representing Ward 8. He has served in Cleveland City Council since 1977. He lives in the North Shore Collinwood area of Cleveland with his wife, Kathy, and has five children: Lisa, Deana, Michael, Lauren and Andrew.

Political career
Polensek was first elected to council in 1977 representing what was Ward 26 until 1982, then representing Ward 11 for ten terms, and is now in his second term representing Ward 8. All totaled he is serving in his 13th term in Council. He served as Council President from 1999 to 2002. He is also an Executive Board member of the Cuyahoga County Democratic Party, and the founder of the Collinwood Nottingham Villages and the Northeast Shores Development Corporations in Ward 11. On November 5, 2013, Polensek won the election for the newly reconfigured Ward 8, uncontested. He was endorsed by the Cleveland Plain Dealer.

City Council positions
Polensek is Vice-Chair of the Public Safety Committee and a member of the 
Health and Human Services, Public Parks, Property and Recreation, Public Service, Public Utilities, and Rules committees.

Personal
Polensek, a Slovene American, grew up in the Slovenian section of Collinwood, attending the Nottingham and Hannah Gibbons Elementary Schools and eventually graduated from Collinwood High School in January 1969, where he is a member of the Collinwood High School Hall of Fame. His mother and two sisters also graduated from Collinwood. He played freshman, junior and varsity football at Collinwood and played on the 1967 unbeaten East Senate Championship Football Team in the Thanksgiving Day Charity Game at Cleveland Lakefront Stadium. Polensek attended Tri-C Community College at their Metro campus through the Cleveland Scholarship Program, where he studied Industrial Management. He remains an active member of the congregation member at St. Mary of the Assumption Slovenian Catholic Church.

Notes

References
 Bennett, David Council Puts Foot Down (8/14/2000) Crain's Cleveland Business Vol. 21 Issue 34, p1. 2p. 
 Cleveland City Councilman's Letter Tells Teen 'Go to Jail or the Cemetery''' Fox News, (July 19, 2007) Associated Press 
 Dear Piece Of Trash: Cleveland Pol Sends Drug Suspect Profanity-Filled Letter (July 19, 2007) The Smoking Gun 
 Berry, Jason Render Unto Rome: The Secret Life of Money in the Catholic Church (2011) Random House
 Welsh, Thomas G. Closing Chapters: Urban Change, Religious Reform, and the Decline of Youngstown's Catholic Elementary Schools, 1960–2006 (2011) Lexington Books
 Cleveland Borrows Big Bucks from the Browns to Fix Stadium (Feb 06, 2012) WOIO / WTOC 
 Larkin, Brent New Ward Map Leads to Cleveland City Council Intrigue: Brent Larkin (May 25, 2013) The Plain Dealer 
 Seaton, Jay Cleveland City Councilman Michael Polensek Offers Reward After Mentally Challenged Man Attacked (8/23/2013) ABC News Channel Five 
 Bike Cleveland Cleveland City Council Candidate Questionnaire: Ward 8 – Michael Polensek Responses'' (Oct. 25th, 2013) Bike Cleveland

External links
 

1949 births
Living people
Ohio Democrats
Cleveland City Council members
Slovene-American culture in Cleveland
21st-century American politicians